The Women's 500 metres competition at the 2020 World Single Distances Speed Skating Championships was held on February 14, 2020.

Results
The race was started at 17:26.

References

Women's 500 metres